...nothing but a dream is a studio album recorded by Australian singer-songwriter, Paul Kelly. It was released on 13 August 2001 via EMI Records, which peaked at No. 7 on the ARIA Albums Chart and No. 46 on the Official New Zealand Music Chart. It was also released in the United States on Cooking Vinyl and included four tracks from Kelly's earlier extended play, Roll on Summer (2000). In Australia and New Zealand the album provided three singles, "Somewhere in the City" (July 2001), "Love Is the Law" (October) and "If I Could Start Today Again" (January 2002).

Two days before the album appeared Kelly had issued a five-track EP, Paul Kelly Exclusive CD, which was provided free with The Weekend Australian Magazine – it has two tracks, "The Pretty Place" and "Somewhere in the City", from the album. It was the first CD to be included with an Australian newspaper magazine, although this did cause problems with home deliveries, with many subscribers missing out. At the ARIA Music Awards of 2002 ...nothing but a dream won Best Adult Contemporary Album for Kelly and he was nominated for Best Male Artist.

Reception 

AllMusic's Jason MacNeil rated the US version of ...nothing but a dream at four-out-of-five stars and explained, "the songs speak of a certain longing and asking for redemption, but are dominantly roots pop arrangements." He observed, "An added bonus is the four additional tracks from a previously released EP, with the funky duet of 'Roll on Summer' being the high point of the lot."

Steve Newton of The Georgia Straight felt it, "contains its share of solo, acoustic ballads, but also sees the singer-songwriter performing with the full band." Newton described the track, "Would You Be My Friend", where Mick Harvey is "handling guitar, organ, bass, and drums" as a "soothing" rendition. They recorded it in Harvey's back yard shed and Kelly explained, "'He's got a bigger shed than me, but he's got the same eight-track tape machine, so we've got a similar basic setup'."

Track listing

Personnel

Credits:
Musicians
 Peter Luscombe – drums
 Dave Ruffy – percussion, drums
 Spencer P. Jones – guitar (electric), vocals
 Bic Runga – vocals
 Bruce Haymes – organ, vocals, keyboards
 Billie Godfrey – vocals
 Paul Kelly – guitar, vocals, keyboards
 Shane O'Mara – guitar (electric)
 Renee Geyer – vocals
 Linda Bull – vocals
 Vika Bull – vocals
 Steve Hadley – bass, fiddle
 Mick Harvey – organ, bass, guitar (electric), drums (track 10)

Recording and artwork details
 Don Bartley – mastering
 Adam Rhodes – engineer
 James Sanger – co-production, programming, sound design
 Martin Philbey – photography
 Paul Kelly – producer (all tracks except track 10)
 Mick Harvey – producer (track 10)
 Mark Wallis – producer (all tracks except track 10)

Paul Kelly Exclusive CD 

Paul Kelly Exclusive CD is a five-track extended play by Paul Kelly, which was provided free with The Weekend Australian Magazine in August 2001. It is a compilation with four audio tracks including two from Kelly's forthcoming album, ...nothing but a dream ("The Pretty Place" and "Somewhere in the City"), one from his previous four-track EP Roll on Summer ("I Was Hoping You'd Say That") in 2000, and one from an associated project Professor Ratbaggy's 1999 self-titled album ("Love Letter"). A music video for "Somewhere in the City" was provided as the fifth track.

It was the first CD to be included with an Australian newspaper magazine, although this did cause problems with home deliveries, with many subscribers missing out.

Track listing

Personnel 

Credits:
Musicians
 Stephen Hadley – bass guitar (tracks 1–2)
 Bruce Haymes – keyboard (tracks 1–3)
 Spencer Jones – guitar (track 1)
 Paul Kelly – guitar, vocals (tracks 1–5)
 Peter Luscombe – drums (tracks 1–2)
 Linda Bull – vocals (track 1)
 Vika Bull – vocals (track 1)

Recording details
 Producer – Mark Wallis (track 1), Paul Kelly (tracks 1–5), Professor Ratbaggy (track 2), Andy Baldwin (tracks 2–3)
 Director – Tony Mahony (track 5)

Charts

Certifications

References 

2001 albums
ARIA Award-winning albums
EMI Records albums
Cooking Vinyl albums
Paul Kelly (Australian musician) albums